Pay And Display is a short-lived British sitcom starring James Bolam that lasted only one series. It was written by Dominic English.

Cast
James Bolam - Sydney Street
Matt Bardock - Danny Weir
Gerald Home - Vicar
Diana Weston - Miss Cummings
Pearce Quigley - Adolf

Plot
Set in an underground car-park, this sitcom mainly focuses around the banter between the two car-park attendants, Sydney and Danny. Sydney spends much of his time talking about past times with his wife, Maureen (who is never seen), while Danny goes on about the opposite sex. Their boss, Miss Cummings, is a no-nonsense woman. Adolf, the traffic warden, also regularly pops in, and thinks of himself as a political activist.

Episodes
"Doctor's Orders" (12 July 2000)
"Father's Day" (13 July 2000)
"An Ill Windfull" (20 July 2000)
"Wedding Belles" (27 July 2000)
"The Italian Job" (3 August 2000)
"A Change Is As Good..." (10 August 2000)

References
Mark Lewisohn, "Radio Times Guide to TV Comedy", BBC Worldwide Ltd, 2003
British TV Comedy Guide for Pay And Display

External links 

2000 British television series debuts
2000 British television series endings
2000s British sitcoms
ITV sitcoms